The 2017 Eliteserien was the 73rd completed season of top-tier football in Norway. The season began on 1 April 2017 and ended on 26 November 2017, not including play-off matches. This was first season of Eliteserien as rebranding from Tippeligaen. Rosenborg were the defending champions, while Kristiansund and Sandefjord entered as the promoted teams from the 2016 1. divisjon.

The 2017 season saw the name of the league change from Tippeligaen (named after sponsor Norsk Tipping) to Eliteserien, a non-sponsor affiliated name controlled by the Football Association of Norway. Rosenborg won their third consecutive title and 25th top-flight title overall, with two games to spare. Rosenborg conceded only 20 goals during the season, a league record.

Overview

Rebranding
On 28 August 2016, the Football Association of Norway (NFF) and Norsk Toppfotball  announced a rebrand; beginning with the 2017 season, the competition was known simply as Eliteserien, without any sponsor's name attached. As part of the rebranding, a new logo was introduced.

Summary
Rosenborg won their third consecutive title and 25th top-flight title overall. Rosenborg were the defending champions, while Kristiansund and Sandefjord entered as the promoted teams from the 2016 1. divisjon.

Rosenborg won the league with two games to spare. Aalesund and Viking were relegated directly. Fourteenth-finishers Sogndal were relegated after losing the play-off final to Ranheim.

Teams
Sixteen teams competed in the league – the top fourteen teams from the previous season, and two teams promoted from the 1. divisjon. The promoted teams were Kristiansund (first season in the top-flight) and Sandefjord, (returning to the top flight after a season's absence). They replaced Bodø/Glimt and Start ending their top flight spells of three and four years respectively.

Stadia and locations

Note: Table lists in alphabetical order.

Personnel and kits

Managerial changes

Transfers

Winter

Summer

League table

Positions by round

Relegation play-offs

The 14th-placed team, Sogndal took part in a two-legged play-off against Ranheim, the winners of the 1. divisjon promotion play-offs, to decide who would play in the 2018 Eliteserien.

1–1 on aggregate. Ranheim won 5–4 on penalties.

Results

Season statistics

Top scorers

Hat-tricks

Notes
(H) – Home team(A) – Away team

Top assists

Clean sheets

Discipline

Player

Most yellow cards: 7
 Flamur Kastrati (Sandefjord)
 Kaj Ramsteijn (Aalesund)
Most red cards: 2
 Andreas Albech (Sarpsborg 08)
 Victor Demba Bindia (Sandefjord)

Club
Most yellow cards: 54  
Sandefjord

Most red cards: 4
Viking

Attendances

Awards

References

Eliteserien seasons
1
Norway
Norway